Robotic process automation (RPA) is a form of business process automation technology based on metaphorical software robots (bots) or on artificial intelligence (AI)/digital workers.  It is sometimes referred to as software robotics (not to be confused with robot software).

In traditional workflow automation tools, a software developer produces a list of actions to automate a task and interface to the back end system using internal application programming interfaces (APIs) or dedicated scripting language. In contrast, RPA systems develop the action list by watching the user perform that task in the application's graphical user interface (GUI), and then perform the automation by repeating those tasks directly in the GUI. This can lower the barrier to the use of automation in products that might not otherwise feature APIs for this purpose.

RPA tools have strong technical similarities to graphical user interface testing tools. These tools also automate interactions with the GUI, and often do so by repeating a set of demonstration actions performed by a user. RPA tools differ from such systems in that they allow data to be handled in and between multiple applications, for instance, receiving email containing an invoice, extracting the data, and then typing that into a bookkeeping system.

Historic evolution

The typical benefits of robotic automation include reduced cost; increased speed, accuracy, and consistency; improved quality and scalability of production. Automation can also provide extra security, especially for sensitive data and financial services.

As a form of automation, the concept has been around for a long time in the form of screen scraping, which can be traced back to early forms of malware. However, RPA is much more extensible, consisting of API integration into other enterprise applications, connectors into ITSM systems, terminal services and even some types of AI (e.g. Machine Learning) services such as image recognition.  It is considered to be a significant technological evolution in the sense that new software platforms are emerging which are sufficiently mature, resilient, scalable and reliable to make this approach viable for use in large enterprises (who would otherwise be reluctant due to perceived risks to quality and reputation).

A principal barrier to the adoption of self-service is often technological: it may not always be feasible or economically viable to retrofit new interfaces onto existing systems. Moreover, organisations may wish to layer a variable and configurable set of process rules on top of the system interfaces which may vary according to market offerings and the type of customer. This only adds to the cost and complexity of the technological implementation. Robotic automation software provides a pragmatic means of deploying new services in this situation, where the robots simply mimic the behaviour of humans to perform the back-end transcription or processing. The relative affordability of this approach arises from the fact that no new IT transformation or investment is required; instead the software robots simply leverage greater use out of existing IT assets.

Use

The hosting of RPA services also aligns with the metaphor of a software robot, with each robotic instance having its own virtual workstation, much like a human worker. The robot uses keyboard and mouse controls to take actions and execute automations. Normally all of these actions take place in a virtual environment and not on screen; the robot does not need a physical screen to operate, rather it interprets the screen display electronically. The scalability of modern solutions based on architectures such as these owes much to the advent of virtualization technology, without which the scalability of large deployments would be limited by the available capacity to manage physical hardware and by the associated costs. The implementation of RPA in business enterprises has shown dramatic cost savings when compared to traditional non-RPA solutions.

There are however several risks with RPA. Criticism includes risks of stifling innovation and creating a more complex maintenance environment of existing software that now needs to consider the use of graphical user interfaces in a way they weren't intended to be used.

Impact on employment

According to Harvard Business Review, most operations groups adopting RPA have promised their employees that automation would not result in layoffs. Instead, workers have been redeployed to do more interesting work. One academic study highlighted that knowledge workers did not feel threatened by automation: they embraced it and viewed the robots as team-mates. The same study highlighted that, rather than resulting in a lower "headcount", the technology was deployed in such a way as to achieve more work and greater productivity with the same number of people.

Conversely, however, some analysts proffer that RPA represents a threat to the business process outsourcing (BPO) industry. The thesis behind this notion is that RPA will enable enterprises to "repatriate" processes from offshore locations into local data centers, with the benefit of this new technology. The effect, if true, will be to create high-value jobs for skilled process designers in onshore locations (and within the associated supply chain of IT hardware, data center management, etc.) but to decrease the available opportunity to low-skilled workers offshore. On the other hand, this discussion appears to be healthy ground for debate as another academic study was at pains to counter the so-called "myth" that RPA will bring back many jobs from offshore.

RPA actual use
 Banking and finance process automation
 Mortgage and lending processes
 Customer care automation
 eCommerce merchandising operations
 Social media marketing
 Optical character recognition applications
 Data extraction process
 Fixed automation process

Impact on society
Academic studies project that RPA, among other technological trends, is expected to drive a new wave of productivity and efficiency gains in the global labour market. Although not directly attributable to RPA alone, Oxford University conjectures that up to 35% of all jobs might be automated by 2035.

There are geographic implications to the trend in robotic automation. In the example above where an offshored process is "repatriated" under the control of the client organization (or even displaced by a Business Process Outsourcer) from an offshore location to a data centre, the impact will be a deficit in economic activity to the offshore location and an economic benefit to the originating economy. On this basis, developed economies – with skills and technological infrastructure to develop and support a robotic automation capability – can be expected to achieve a net benefit from the trend.

In a TEDx talk hosted by University College London (UCL), entrepreneur David Moss explains that digital labour in the form of RPA is likely to revolutionize the cost model of the services industry by driving the price of products and services down, while simultaneously improving the quality of outcomes and creating increased opportunity for the personalization of services.

In a separate TEDx in 2019 talk, Japanese business executive, and former CIO of Barclays bank, Koichi Hasegawa noted that digital robots can be a positive effect on society if we start using a robot with empathy to help every person. He provides a case study of the Japanese insurance companies – Sompo Japan and Aioi – both of whom introduced bots to speed up the process of insurance pay-outs in past massive disaster incidents.

Meanwhile, Professor Willcocks, author of the LSE paper cited above, speaks of increased job satisfaction and intellectual stimulation, characterising the technology as having the ability to "take the robot out of the human", a reference to the notion that robots will take over the mundane and repetitive portions of people's daily workload, leaving them to be used in more interpersonal roles or to concentrate on the remaining, more meaningful, portions of their day.

It was also found in a 2021 study observing the effects of robotization in Europe that, the gender pay gap increased at a rate of .18% for every 1% increase in robotization of a given industry.

Unassisted RPA 
Unassisted RPA, or RPAAI, is the next generation of RPA related technologies. Technological advancements around artificial intelligence allow a process to be run on a computer without needing input from a user.

Hyperautomation 

Hyperautomation is the application of advanced technologies like RPA, artificial intelligence, machine learning (ML) and process mining to augment workers and automate processes in ways that are significantly more impactful than traditional automation capabilities. Hyperautomation is the combination of automation tools to deliver work.

Gartner’s report notes that this trend was kicked off with robotic process automation (RPA). The report notes that, “RPA alone is not hyper-automation. Hyperautomation requires a combination of tools and technologies like Robotic Data Automation to help support replicating pieces of where the human is involved in a task."

Outsourcing 
Back office clerical processes outsourced by large organisations - particularly those sent offshore - tend to be simple and transactional in nature, requiring little (if any) analysis or subjective judgement. This would seem to make an ideal starting point for organizations beginning to adopt robotic automation for the back office. Whether client organisations choose to take outsourced processes back "in house" from their Business Process Outsourcing (BPO) providers, thus representing a threat to the future of the BPO business, or whether the BPOs implement such automations on their clients' behalf may well depend on a number of factors.

Conversely however, a BPO provider may seek to effect some form of client lock-in by means of automation. By removing cost from a business operation, where the BPO provider is considered to be the owner of the intellectual property and physical implementation of a robotic automation solution (perhaps in terms of hardware, ownership of software licences, etc.), the provider can make it very difficult for the client to take a process back "in house" or elect a new BPO provider. This effect occurs as the associated cost savings made through automation would - temporarily at least - have to be reintroduced to the business whilst the technical solution is reimplemented in the new operational context.

The geographically agnostic nature of software means that new business opportunities may arise for those organisations that have a political or regulatory impediment to offshoring or outsourcing. A robotised automation can be hosted in a data centre in any jurisdiction and this has two major consequences for BPO providers. Firstly, for example, a sovereign government may not be willing or legally able to outsource the processing of tax affairs and security administration.  On this basis, if robots are compared to a human workforce, this creates a genuinely new opportunity for a "third sourcing" option, after the choices of onshore vs. offshore. Secondly, and conversely, BPO providers have previously relocated outsourced operations to different political and geographic territories in response to changing wage inflation and new labor arbitrage opportunities elsewhere. By contrast, a data centre solution would seem to offer a fixed and predictable cost base that, if sufficiently low in cost on a robot vs. human basis,  would seem to eliminate any potential need or desire to continually relocate operational bases.

Examples 
 Voice recognition and digital dictation software linked to join up business processes for straight through processing without manual intervention
 Specialised Remote Infrastructure Management software featuring automated investigation and resolution of problems, using robots for the first line IT support
Chatbots used by internet retailers and service providers to service customer requests for information. Also used by companies to service employee requests for information from internal databases
 Presentation layer automation software, increasingly used by Business Process Outsourcers to displace human labor
 IVR systems incorporating intelligent interaction with callers

See also
Automation
Business process automation

References

Further reading
  
 van der Aalst, W.M.P., Bichler, M. & Heinzl, A. Robotic Process Automation. Bus Inf Syst Eng 60, 269–272 (2018). 
 Hofmann, P., Samp, C. & Urbach, N. Robotic process automation. Electron Markets 30, 99–106 (2020). 
 
 Aguirre S., Rodriguez A. (2017) Automation of a Business Process Using Robotic Process Automation (RPA): A Case Study. In: Figueroa-García J., López-Santana E., Villa-Ramírez J., Ferro-Escobar R. (eds) Applied Computer Sciences in Engineering. WEA 2017. Communications in Computer and Information Science, vol 742. Springer, Cham.  
 
 Willcocks, Leslie, Mary Lacity, and Andrew Craig. “Robotic Process Automation: Strategic Transformation Lever for Global Business Services?” Journal of Information Technology Teaching Cases 7, no. 1 (May 2017): 17–28. .
 A. Leshob, A. Bourgouin and L. Renard, "Towards a Process Analysis Approach to Adopt Robotic Process Automation," 2018 IEEE 15th International Conference on e-Business Engineering (ICEBE), 2018, pp. 46–53, .
 Santos, F., Pereira, R. and Vasconcelos, J.B. (2020), "Toward robotic process automation implementation: an end-to-end perspective", Business Process Management Journal, Vol. 26 No. 2, pp. 405–420.  
 Chakraborti T. et al. (2020) From Robotic Process Automation to Intelligent Process Automation. In: Asatiani A. et al. (eds) Business Process Management: Blockchain and Robotic Process Automation Forum. BPM 2020. Lecture Notes in Business Information Processing, vol 393. Springer, Cham.  
 J. G. Enríquez, A. Jiménez-Ramírez, F. J. Domínguez-Mayo and J. A. García-García, "Robotic Process Automation: A Scientific and Industrial Systematic Mapping Study," in IEEE Access, vol. 8, pp. 39113–39129, 2020, .
 Agostinelli S., Marrella A., Mecella M. (2019) Research Challenges for Intelligent Robotic Process Automation. In: Di Francescomarino C., Dijkman R., Zdun U. (eds) Business Process Management Workshops. BPM 2019. Lecture Notes in Business Information Processing, vol 362. Springer, Cham. 
 M. Ratia, J. Myllärniemi, and N. Helander. 2018. Robotic Process Automation - Creating Value by Digitalizing Work in the Private Healthcare? In Proceedings of the 22nd International Academic Mindtrek Conference (Mindtrek '18). Association for Computing Machinery, New York, NY, USA, 222–227. 
 Nishani Edirisinghe Vincent, Amy Igou, Mary B. Burns; Preparing for the Robots: A Proposed Course in Robotic Process Automation. Journal of Emerging Technologies in Accounting 1 September 2020; 17 (2): 75–91. 
 J. Chacón Montero, A. Jimenez Ramirez and J. Gonzalez Enríquez, "Towards a Method for Automated Testing in Robotic Process Automation Projects," 2019 IEEE/ACM 14th International Workshop on Automation of Software Test (AST), 2019, pp. 42–47, .
 T. Kobayashi, K. Arai, T. Imai, S. Tanimoto, H. Sato and A. Kanai, "Communication Robot for Elderly Based on Robotic Process Automation," 2019 IEEE 43rd Annual Computer Software and Applications Conference (COMPSAC), 2019, pp. 251–256, .
 Herm LV. et al. (2020) A Consolidated Framework for Implementing Robotic Process Automation Projects. In: Fahland D., Ghidini C., Becker J., Dumas M. (eds) Business Process Management. BPM 2020. Lecture Notes in Computer Science, vol 12168. Springer, Cham.

External links
Jobs, productivity and the great decoupling, by Professor McAfee, Principal Research Scientist at MIT’s Center for Digital Business.
Rise of the software machines, Economist Magazine.
London School of Economics Releases First in a Series of RPA Case Studies, Reuters
Humans and Machines: The role of people in technology-driven organisations, Economist Magazine.
Robotic Automation as Threat to Traditional Low-Cost Outsourcing, HfS Research.

Robotics
Business software
Automation software
Information economy
Machine learning